Sadegh Zibakalam Mofrad (born 12 June 1948) is an Iranian academic, author and pundit described as reformist and neo-liberal. Zibakalam is a professor at University of Tehran and appears frequently on international news outlets including the BBC News and Al Jazeera. His books "How Did We Become What We Are? " and "An Introduction to Islamic Revolution" are among bestsellers and prominent books on Iranian contemporary politics.

Zibakalam has become a familiar face in Iran for his passionate and daring debates with hardliners in which he publicly challenges the state line on many sensitive topics.

Early life
Zibakalam was born into a Shiite family in Tehran. He obtained his Ph.D. in political science from the University of Bradford in the United Kingdom. Zibakalam was a critic of the Shah during his reign and was jailed for 2 years due to this.

Zebakalam held several government positions after the 1979 Iranian Revolution and played a major role in the Cultural_Revolution_in_Iran, something he has later apologized for and expressed regret over.

2000 Parliament election disqualification  
While teaching at Islamic Azad University of Zanjan, Zibakalam registered as a candidate for the 2000 Iranian legislative election from Zanjan, but he was disqualified by the Guardian council.

Views 
In January 2014, Zebakalam wrote an open letter to Hassan Rouhani and criticized him for not focusing on his campaign promises including freeing political prisoners and ending house arrest of the 2009 presidential candidates (Mir-Hossein Mousavi, Zahra Rahnavard, and Mehdi Karroubi). This was in reaction to a recent Rouhani's speech in praise of pro-government protests against Green Movement protests on Ashura of 2009.

Zibakalam has questioned the achievements of the nuclear program of Iran and for this he has been charged with "weakening the system".
In February 2014, Zibakalam publicly stated that he recognized the State of Israel because the United Nations recognises it as a state.

Bibliography
'How Did We Become What We Are? Souvenir Photographs with Civil Society 
 An Introduction to Islamic RevolutionHow The West Became The West''

Accolades 
 Deutsche Welle Freedom of Speech Award (2018)

References

External references/links

 Official website
 Sadegh Zibakalam's Interview at The Guardian on Political views
 Books by Sadegh Zibakalam
 Sadegh Zibakalam's biography
 Sadegh Zibakalam's profile at Middle East Institute

Iranian political scientists
Iranian writers
Iranian activists
Academic staff of Zanjan University
Alumni of the University of Bradford
Academic staff of the Islamic Azad University, Central Tehran Branch
Academic staff of the University of Tehran
1948 births
Living people
Political commentators
Alumni of the University of Huddersfield
Iranian critics
Iranian expatriates in the United Kingdom